
Andrew Harris McGalliard (September 25, 1906 – May 26, 1978), better known as Bucky Harris, was an American professional baseball player who played in the Japanese Baseball League from 1936 to 1938. While playing for the Korakuen Eagles in the fall of 1937, he won the Japanese Baseball League Most Valuable Player Award.

See also 
 American expatriate baseball players in Japan

References

Further reading

External links

 

American expatriate baseball players in Japan
Baseball players from California
Sacramento Senators players
Wichita Aviators players
1906 births
1978 deaths
Nagoya Kinko players